The 1938–39 season was the 64th season of competitive football in England.

Honours

Notes = Number in parentheses is the times that club has won that honour. * indicates new record for competition

Football League

First Division

Second Division

Third Division North

Third Division South

Top goalscorers

First Division
Tommy Lawton (Everton) – 35 goals

Second Division
Hugh Billington (Luton Town) – 28 goals

Third Division North
Wally Hunt (Carlisle United) – 32 goals

Third Division South
Ben Morton (Swindon Town) – 28 goals

References